Cathorops hypophthalmus, the gloomy sea catfish, is a species of sea catfish. It is found in coastal and estuarine waters of Costa Rica and Panama. Maximum recorded body length is 35 cm.

References

Ariidae
Fish described in 1876
Taxa named by Franz Steindachner